Pseudocellus bolivari is an arachnid species in the order Ricinulei. It occurs in caves in Chiapas, Mexico. The specific epithet is a tribute to Cándido Luis Bolívar y Pieltáin.

References 

 Gertsch, 1971 : Three new ricinuleids from Mexican caves (Arachnida, Ricinulei). Association for Mexican Cave Studies bulletin, n. 4, p. 127-135

Animals described in 1971
Ricinulei
Cave arachnids
Endemic spiders of Mexico
Natural history of Chiapas